"Stuck on You" was Elvis Presley's first hit single after his two-year stint in the US Army, reaching number one in 1960 in the US.

He recorded the song during March 1960, and the single was released within weeks and went to number one on the Billboard Hot 100 chart in late-April 1960, becoming his first number-one single of the 1960s and thirteenth overall. "Stuck on You" also peaked at number six on the R&B chart. The song knocked Percy Faith's "Theme from A Summer Place" from the top spot, ending its nine-week run at number one on the chart. The record reached number three in the UK.

The song was written by Aaron Schroeder and J. Leslie McFarland and published by Gladys Music, Elvis Presley's publishing company.

The single had a special picture sleeve with the RCA Victor logo and catalog number on the top right corner and included, in large letters, "ELVIS" in red on the top right. On the bottom left appeared the statement: "Elvis' 1st new recording for his 50,000,000 fans all over the world." The U.S. picture sleeve had photos of Elvis on the left top corner and the lower right corner. The New Zealand sleeve did not have the photographs on the corners but had the "45 R.P.M." designation on the top right corner.

Personnel
Sourced from AFM contracts.

The Blue Moon Boys
Elvis Presley - lead vocals, acoustic rhythm guitar
Scotty Moore - lead guitar
 D. J. Fontana - drums
Additional personnel and production staff
 Hank Garland - six-string “tic-tac” bass guitar
 Bob Moore - double bass
 Floyd Cramer - piano
 Buddy Harman - drums
 The Jordanaires - backing vocals

Chart performance

Weekly charts

Year-end charts

All-time charts

See also
 List of Hot 100 number-one singles of 1960 (U.S.)
 List of number-one singles in Australia during the 1960s

References

1960 singles
Elvis Presley songs
Billboard Hot 100 number-one singles
Cashbox number-one singles
Songs written by Aaron Schroeder
1960 songs
RCA Victor singles
Songs written by John Leslie McFarland